, is a female Japanese former volleyball player who competed in the 1968 Summer Olympics and in the 1972 Summer Olympics.

In 1968 she was part of the Japanese team which won the silver medal in the Olympic tournament. She played all seven matches.

Four years later she won her second Olympic silver medal with the Japanese team. She played one match.

External links
 profile

1945 births
Living people
Olympic volleyball players of Japan
Volleyball players at the 1968 Summer Olympics
Volleyball players at the 1972 Summer Olympics
Olympic silver medalists for Japan
Japanese women's volleyball players
Olympic medalists in volleyball
Asian Games medalists in volleyball
Volleyball players at the 1970 Asian Games
Medalists at the 1970 Asian Games
Asian Games gold medalists for Japan
Medalists at the 1972 Summer Olympics
Medalists at the 1968 Summer Olympics
20th-century Japanese women